USS Lowell (SP-504) was a United States Navy patrol vessel and minesweeper in commission from 1917 to 1919.

Lowell was built as a commercial steam lighter of the same name in 1909 by Verdin's Yard at Staten Island, New York. In 1917 she was rebuilt as a steam tug by Shewan’s Dry Dock Company at Brooklyn, New York.

The U.S. Navy acquired Lowell under charter from her owner, Neptune Line, Inc., of New York City, on 29 September 1917 for World War I service as a patrol vessel and minesweeper. The Navy took control of her and commissioned her the same day at Tompkinsville on Staten Island as USS Lowell (SP-504).

Assigned to the 3rd Naval District, Lowell operated out of New York Harbor for the remainder of World War I as a dispatch boat and harbor patrol craft. In addition, she operated as a minesweeper and swept for naval mines in The Narrows and off southern Long Island.

After the war, Lowell was decommissioned on 16 May 1919 and was returned to the Neptune Line the same day.

References

NavSource Online: Section Patrol Craft Photo Archive Lowell (SP 504)

Minesweepers of the United States Navy
Patrol vessels of the United States Navy
World War I patrol vessels of the United States
World War I auxiliary ships of the United States
Ships built in New York City
1909 ships